Afrasura indecisa is a moth of the  subfamily Arctiinae. It is found in Angola, Cameroon, the Democratic Republic of Congo, Equatorial Guinea, Ethiopia, Gabon, Ghana, Kenya, Nigeria, Uganda and Zimbabwe.

Subspecies
Afrasura indecisa indecisa
Afrasura indecisa orientalis Durante, 2009 (Ethiopia)

References

indecisa
Moths of Africa
Insects of West Africa
Insects of Uganda
Insects of Angola
Insects of Ethiopia
Insects of Equatorial Guinea
Insects of Zimbabwe
Moths described in 1865